The year 1821 in architecture involved some significant events.

Buildings and structures

Buildings

 The Schauspielhaus in Berlin (begun in 1819), designed by Karl Friedrich Schinkel, is completed.
 The Palais Leuchtenberg in Munich (begun in 1817), designed by Leo von Klenze, is completed.
 The Haymarket Theatre in London, designed by John Nash, is completed.
 Prince Ludwig I of Bavaria, wishing to build a monument to German unity and heroism (and the defeat of Napoleon), commissions Leo von Klenze to build a replica of the Parthenon on a bluff overlooking the Danube River near Regensburg, the Walhalla memorial.
 The Strasbourg Opera House is completed
 The Maitland Monument in Corfu, designed by George Whitmore, is built.

Awards
 Grand Prix de Rome, architecture: Guillaume-Abel Blouet

Births
 January 2 – Napoleon LeBrun, American architect (died 1901)
 February 4 – Major Rohde Hawkins, English school and church architect (died 1884)
 February 13 – John Turtle Wood, English architect (died 1890)
 February 20 – Frigyes Feszl, Hungarian architect (died 1884)
 April – Thomas Brunner, English-born architect working in New Zealand (died 1874)

 April 11 – James Campbell Walker, Scottish architect (died 1888)
 July 4 – A. J. Humbert, English architect patronised by the royal family (died 1877)
 August 1 – James Gowans, Scottish architect (died 1890)
 November 26 – Charles Webb, English-born architect working in Victoria (Australia) (died 1898)
 Giuseppe Bonavia, Maltese architect (died 1885)
 John Elkington Gill, English architect working in Bath (died 1874)

Deaths
 March 1 – John Yenn, English architect (born 1750)
 October 4 – John Rennie the Elder, Scottish-born civil engineer (born 1761)

Architecture
Years in architecture
19th-century architecture